Sofia Belingheri (born 24 April 1995) is an Italian snowboarder. She competed at the 2018 Winter Olympics, and 2022 Winter Olympics, in Women's snowboard cross. 

She competed in the 2020–21 FIS Freestyle Ski World Cup, 2021–22 FIS Freestyle Ski World Cup.

References 

Living people
1995 births
Italian female snowboarders
Olympic snowboarders of Italy
Snowboarders at the 2022 Winter Olympics